Cold Lake is the third studio album by Swiss extreme metal band Celtic Frost, released on 1 September 1988 by Noise Records. It features a new lineup, reformed by bandleader Tom Warrior with newly joined musicians Oliver Amberg, Curt Victor Bryant and a returning Stephen Priestly, who had previously played with the band in 1984 on the Morbid Tales EP. Despite it being marketed to exploit the mass appeal of glam metal, the album has more of a traditional heavy metal sound.

The album was not popular with the group or its fans and is no longer available to buy, making the LP much sought after by collectors.

Background
After a disheartening end to their "One in Their Pride" tour in Dallas, Texas, Tom Warrior decided to end the band. However, in mid-1988, at the request of Oliver Amberg and with the support of producer Tony Platt, the band was resurrected, although with an entirely new line-up (Oliver Amberg – guitars, Curt Victor Bryant – bass, Stephen Priestly – drums and additional vocals). Even though the project had the cooperation of Warrior, he held little interest in it and so allowed Amberg to do most of the musical composition.

Reception

Upon its release, the album was slammed by most music critics and the band was labeled a sell-out by its core fanbase. The appearance of the band was remade with teased hairstyle to look like popular glam metal acts such as Mötley Crüe. The earlier works by the band had been underground thrash/death/black metal. Modern reviews are more positive. AllMusic reviewer Bradley Torreano wrote that Cold Lake is "still the worst Celtic Frost album", but that it "really isn't that bad" and the "vibrant heavy metal here... is longing to be rediscovered by fans." Canadian journalist Martin Popoff considered Cold Lake a "good record", filled with riffs "awesome and sinister" and lyrics about street-level sin "almost scarier" than the abandoned black metal ones.

Legacy
Amberg was quickly fired after the release of the album. When the band re-issued its back catalogue in 1999, they purposely omitted Cold Lake.

Some of the tracks appear on the compilation album Parched with Thirst Am I and Dying but in a different, heavier mix that Tom Warrior supervised.

Tom Warrior had this to say about Cold Lake:

Tom has also said it was the "absolute worst I could do in my lifetime." He has also called it "an utter piece of shit" and "possibly the worst album ever created in heavy music."

Track listing

Personnel
Celtic Frost
Tom Gabriel Warrior – lead and backing vocals, rhythm guitar, effects
Oliver Amberg – lead and rhythm guitars, effects, backing vocals
Curt Victor Bryant – bass, effects, backing vocals, lead guitar on track 11
Stephen Priestly – drums, backing vocals

Additional musicians
Michelle Villanueva – backing vocals, additional lead vocals on track 5
Brian Hewett – rap on track 1, backing vocals on track 2
Xavier Russell – backing vocals on tracks 1 and 11

Production
Celtic Frost, Tony Platt – producers, arrangements, mixing at Conny Plank Studio
Thomas Steeler, Dexter – assistant engineers
Karl-Ulrich Walterbach – executive producer

References

Celtic Frost albums
1988 albums
Albums produced by Tony Platt
Noise Records albums
Glam metal albums